Sten-Åke Cederhök (born Sten-Åke Carlsson) (30 January 1913 – 14 January 1990) was a Swedish actor and comedian.

Cederhök was born in Småland but mainly grew up in Gothenburg. For much of his career he wrote and acted in popular revues while holding down regular jobs. Early on he became widely known around Gothenburg, but television made him more famous from the 1960s on. His most memorable television role was in Albert & Herbert, which ran from 1974 to 1979 and reappeared as a special Christmas series in 1982.

He was an ardent supporter of the football team GAIS.

See also
Albert & Herbert

References

External links

1913 births
1990 deaths
20th-century Swedish male actors
People from Gothenburg
Swedish male comedians
Swedish male television actors
Swedish male film actors
20th-century Swedish comedians
People from Småland